Mr. Citizen is a 30-minute American anthology series of dramas based on actual acts of heroism performed by average people. It was produced by Ed Byron and hosted by Allyn Edwards.  Among its guest stars were Hal Holbrook, Paul Lukas, James Daly and Anne Seymour. Thirteen episodes aired on ABC from April 10, 1955 to July 13, 1955.

References

External links
Mr. Citizen at CVTA with episode list

1950s American anthology television series
1955 American television series debuts
1955 American television series endings
American Broadcasting Company original programming
Black-and-white American television shows